In 1999, the French national rugby union team conducted a tour of Samoa, Tonga and New Zealand.

Matches
Scores and results list France's points tally first.

tour
1999 in Oceanian rugby union
1999 in New Zealand rugby union
1999
1999
1999
1999
1999
1999 in Samoan rugby union
1999 in Tongan rugby union